Barry Petten (born July 22, 1966) is a Canadian politician, who was elected to the Newfoundland and Labrador House of Assembly in the 2015 provincial election. He represents the electoral district of Conception Bay South as a member of the Progressive Conservative Party.

Petten was a mental health counsellor for 20 years. He served on the NL Association of Social Workers and the Municipal Appeals Board. He was also President and Chief Shop Stewart of Local 6234. He worked as an executive assistant to various ministers from 2009 to 2015.

In 2018, Petten endorsed Ches Crosbie in the 2018 provincial PC leadership race.

Petten was re-elected in the 2019 and 2021 provincial elections.

Election results

References

1966 births
Living people
Progressive Conservative Party of Newfoundland and Labrador MHAs
21st-century Canadian politicians